KNLP (89.7 FM) is a radio station broadcasting a Christian format as an affiliate of Here's Help Network.  Licensed to Potosi, Missouri, United States, the station is currently owned by New Life Evangelistic Center and features programming from Salem Communications.

References

External links
 
 

NLP
Southern Gospel radio stations in the United States
Radio stations established in 1998
1998 establishments in Missouri